The  World Team Championship 2012 (WTC 2012) was played from 1 to 4 July 2012 in Beijing, China. It was the second edition of the World Team Championship which was sanctioned by the World Pool-Billiard Association, for pool teams.

The event was won the Chinese Taipei team by a 4–0 victory in the final against Japan. The defending champion Great Britain was eliminated in the semi-finals against the eventual champion.

Format 
Each participating team consisted of four to five players, including at least one female player. The games consisted of two sets in the disciplines eight-ball, nine-ball and ten-ball with the two 8-ball matches were played in men's singles. The woman played a 9-ball and a 10-ball match. The two 10-ball matches were played as a double, whilst 9-ball was played in singles.

Prize money
A total of $300,000 in prize money was distributed, the winning team received $80,000. Below are the prize money per team indicated.

Participating teams 
Teams were split into six groups of four, with the top two from each group progressing. Teams were made up of either four or five players. Teams representing each nation are shown below:

Tournament bracket
The results below are from the knockout stages onwards.

References

External links 
 

World Team Championship (pool)
2012 in cue sports
2012 in Chinese sport
International sports competitions hosted by China
Sports competitions in Beijing
July 2012 sports events in Europe